Red wattle may refer to:

Animals 
 Red Wattle hog, domestic pig breed

Plants 
 Acacia crassicarpa, a tree native to Australia (Queensland), West Papua (Indonesia) and Papua New Guinea
 Acacia flavescens, a tree in the genus Acacia native to eastern Australia
 Acacia monticola, a species of plant in the legume family that is native to Australia
 Acacia silvestris, a tree in the genus Acacia native to southeastern Australia

See also 
 Red wattlebird, a honeyeater also known as Barkingbird or Gillbird
 Red-wattled lapwing, a lapwing or large plover, a wader in the family Charadriidae
 Red stem wattle, Acacia myrtifolia, also known as a myrtle wattle